Public artworks in Hong Kong include:

 Chinese War Memorial
 The Flying Frenchman
 Hong Kong Film Awards statue
 HSBC lions
 Lady Liberty Hong Kong
 Pillar of Shame
 Statue of Anita Mui
 Statue of Bruce Lee
 Statue of George VI
 Statue of McDull
 Statue of Queen Victoria
 Statue of Sir Thomas Jackson, 1st Baronet
 Three Heads Six Arms

See also

 List of public art in Shanghai

Public art
Hong Kong